Mikael Flygind Larsen (born 18 September 1982) is a Norwegian long track speed skater. He competed for Norway at the 2010 Winter Olympics in the Men's 1000 m and Men's 1500 m. He finished 15th and 8th respectively.

References

External links
 

1982 births
Living people
Norwegian male speed skaters
Olympic speed skaters of Norway
Speed skaters at the 2006 Winter Olympics
Speed skaters at the 2010 Winter Olympics
21st-century Norwegian people